Chenaru may refer to:
 Chenaru, Fars
 Chenaru, Kerman